Ctenotus alleni, also known commonly as the Ajana ctenotus and Allen's ctenotus,  is a species of skink, a lizard in the family Scincidae. The species is endemic to Western Australia.

Etymology
The specific name, alleni, is in honour of Nicholas T. Allen, who collected the holotype.

Habitat
The preferred natural habitats of C. alleni are savanna and shrubland.

Reproduction
C. alleni is oviparous.

References

Further reading
Cogger HG (2014). Reptiles and Amphibians of Australia, Seventh Edition. Clayton, Victoria, Australia: CSIRO Publishing. xxx + 1,033 pp. .
Storr GM (1974). "The genus Ctenotus (Lacertilia: Scincidae) in the South-west and Eucla Divisions of Western Australia". Journal of the Royal Society of Western Australia 56: 86–93. (Ctenotus alleni, new species).
Wilson S, Swan G (2013). A Complete Guide to Reptiles of Australia, Fourth Edition. Sydney: New Holland Publishers. 522 pp. .

alleni
Reptiles described in 1974
Taxa named by Glen Milton Storr